This is a list of channels broadcast in Punjabi language.

Government Owned Channel
DD Punjabi

General Entertainment
PTC Punjabi
Zee Punjabi

Movies
Maha Punjabi
Manoranjan Movies

News

Living India News
ABP Sanjha
BBC News Punjabi
News18 Punjab Haryana Himachal
PTC News
Zee Punjab Haryana Himachal

Music
9X Tashan

Religious
Akaal Channel
Sangat TV
Sikh Channel

See also
List of Punjabi media
List of Punjabi-language newspapers

References

Lists of television channels by language
Lists of television channels in India
Punjabi
Punjabi language-related lists